The 1992/93 FIS Freestyle Skiing World Cup was the fourteenth World Cup season in freestyle skiing organised by International Ski Federation. The season started on 10 December 1992 and ended on 28 March 1993. This season included four disciplines: aerials, moguls, ballet and combined.

Men

Moguls

Ballet

Aerials

Combined

Ladies

Moguls

Ballet

Aerials

Combined

Men's standings

Overall 

Standings after 40 races.

Moguls 

Standings after 12 races.

Aerials 

Standings after 9 races.

Ballet 

Standings after 10 races.

Combined 

Standings after 9 races.

Ladies' standings

Overall 

Standings after 40 races.

Moguls 

Standings after 12 races.

Aerials 

Standings after 9 races.

Ballet 

Standings after 10 races.

Combined 

Standings after 9 races.

References

FIS Freestyle Skiing World Cup
World Cup
World Cup